Cledus Envy is a 2002 album released by country music parodist Cledus T. Judd, released on Monument Records. It features "Leave You Laughin'", Judd's first serious song. Phil Vassar contributes a spoken line to the end of "Just Another Day in Parodies".

The compact disc was released with a bonus multimedia disc, containing the video for the song "Breath".

Track listing
"It's a Great Day to Be a Guy"
parody of "It's a Great Day to Be Alive" by Travis Tritt
"Breath"
parody of "Breathe" by Faith Hill
"Willie's Got a Big Deck"
original song
"Let's Burn One"
original song
"My Voice"
parody of "One Voice" by Billy Gilman
"Man of Constant Borrow"
parody of "I Am a Man of Constant Sorrow" by the Soggy Bottom Boys
feat. Diamond Rio
"Let's Shoot Dove"
parody of "Let's Make Love" by Faith Hill & Tim McGraw
"1/2"
parody of "Yes!" by Chad Brock
"If George Strait Starts Dancin'"
original song
"Just Another Day in Parodies"
parody of "Just Another Day in Paradise" by Phil Vassar
"Leave You Laughin'"
original song
"Don't Mess with America"
parody of "Only in America" by Brooks & Dunn

Chart performance

2002 albums
Cledus T. Judd albums
Monument Records albums
2000s comedy albums